Swimming for both men and women has been a part of the Pan American Games since the Games' first edition in 1951. The United States is the most successful country, winning 334 gold medals and 706 overall.

Men's events

Women's events

All-time medal table

Long course swimming

Marathon swimming

Combined total

Medalists

Championships records

References
 USA Swimming
 Results

 
Sports at the Pan American Games
Pan American Games